Joseph Pennington may refer to:
 Joseph Pennington (diplomat), American diplomat
 Sir Joseph Pennington, 2nd Baronet, British landowner and politician
 Joe Pennington, American musician